The discography of Fozzy, a heavy metal band from Atlanta, Georgia, consists of eight studio albums, one live album, two compilation albums, two video albums, twenty-four singles and ten music videos.

The band was formed in 1999, by Chris Jericho (vocals) and Rich Ward (guitar).

Albums

Studio albums

Live albums

Compilation albums

Video albums

Singles

Music videos

References

Discography
Heavy metal group discographies
Discographies of American artists